Den Haan Rotterdam B.V. is a company that makes navigation lights, searchlights, floodlights and ship's horns for the shipping industry. It has a history in Rotterdam, the Netherlands. It was established August 7, 1922, by Marinus den Haan as a tinsmith workshop. The company also manufactures decorative nautical oil and electric lamps.

The company imports intermediates and exports products, adopting the logo "DHR" internationally.

Research and development 

The part of the Royal Netherlands Meteorological Institute that approved and certified the nautical lights, compasses and instruments in Rotterdam closed in 1988. This meant that all the lanterns had to be tested in house and certificates provided. For this purpose a room furnished with the necessary equipment, as directed by the government, was purchased.

After 1.5 years of research, the "Burtone" horn was brought to market. A TNO test report confirmed that the horns even meet German standards. The entire range ZEEKRO-search lights was tested and the entire structure was renovated to meet CE regulations.

In 2009, the noise test area was restructured due to increased air horns complaints from the immediate vicinity. In 2010, new products included a signal lamp with LED, and a new motor housing for searchlights. In 2012 development began for an inland navigation lantern with LED technology.

Acquisitions 

 1979—the last Dutch competitor P.J. van den Bosch
 1992—part of German company Brökelmann (BJB)
 1993—the production of the “BURTONE”-ship's horns
 1999—ZEEKRO, manufacturer of marine searchlights for inland vessels for more than 50 years

Locations 

Started at Zalmhaven in Rotterdam, with a workshop of 65 m²
On 14 May 1940 house and the company was hit by the bombing of Rotterdam. Both buildings were destroyed. The company moved to Westzeedijk in Rotterdam for the war's duration.
In the early 1950s it moved to the Hoornbrekerstraat, a building of 450 m² and expanded there.
In 1962, a new factory building was built on the Wijnhaven with a total floor area of 3,150 m²
In 1983, an adjoining plot of 1,000 m² became the site of the press, tooling shop and the shipping department.
The current business had to be diverted to Capelle aan den IJssel and from January 2008 could be moved into a new facility of 5,000 m² of production, warehouse and office facilities .

External links 
 

Manufacturing companies of the Netherlands
Capelle aan den IJssel
History of Rotterdam